Wiski  is a village in the administrative district of Gmina Komarówka Podlaska, within Radzyń Podlaski County, Lublin Voivodeship, in eastern Poland.

The village has a population of 328.

References

Villages in Radzyń Podlaski County